HD 50885, also known as HR 2581, is a star located in the northern circumpolar constellation Camelopardalis, the giraffe. It has an apparent magnitude of 5.69, making it faintly visible to the naked eye if viewed under ideal conditions. Based on parallax measurements from Gaia DR3, the object is estimated to be 513 light years distant.

This is a solitary, evolved  red giant star with a stellar classification of K4 III. It is currently on the red giant branch, fusing a hydrogen shell around an inert helium core. It has 1.32 times the mass of the Sun but has expanded to 30.4 times its girth. HD 50885 has an iron abundance only 102% that of the Sun, placing it at solar metallicity.

This object was first noticed by Robert S. Ball in 1879

References

Camelopardalis (constellation)
Double stars
K-type giants
050885
033827
2581
BD+70 00430